The 1998–99 NBA season was the 76ers 50th season in the National Basketball Association, and 36th season in Philadelphia. On March 23, 1998, the owners of all 29 NBA teams voted 27–2 to reopen the league's collective bargaining agreement, seeking changes to the league's salary cap system, and a ceiling on individual player salaries. The National Basketball Players Association (NBPA) opposed to the owners' plan, and wanted raises for players who earned the league's minimum salary. After both sides failed to reach an agreement, the owners called for a lockout, which began on July 1, 1998, putting a hold on all team trades, free agent signings and training camp workouts, and cancelling many NBA regular season and preseason games. Due to the lockout, the NBA All-Star Game, which was scheduled to be played in Philadelphia on February 14, 1999, was also cancelled. However, on January 6, 1999, NBA commissioner David Stern, and NBPA director Billy Hunter finally reached an agreement to end the lockout. The deal was approved by both the players and owners, and was signed on January 20, ending the lockout after 204 days. The regular season began on February 5, and was cut short to just 50 games instead of the regular 82-game schedule.

The Sixers had the eighth pick in the 1998 NBA draft, and selected Larry Hughes out of Saint Louis University. In the off-season, the Sixers signed free agents Matt Geiger, George Lynch, and Harvey Grant, and later on re-signing former 76ers forward Rick Mahorn in late February. At midseason, they traded second-year forward Tim Thomas and Scott Williams to the Milwaukee Bucks in exchange for Tyrone Hill. The Sixers won six straight games after a 4–5 start, and had their first winning month in five years winning 8 of 13 games in February, on their way to making the playoffs for the first time in eight years with a 28–22 record, third in the Atlantic Division.

Allen Iverson led the league in scoring averaging 26.8 points, and contributed 4.6 assists and 2.3 steals per game, and was selected to the All-NBA First Team. In addition, Geiger averaged 13.5 points and 7.2 rebounds per game, while Theo Ratliff provided the team with 11.2 points, 8.1 rebounds and 3.0 blocks per game, and was named to the NBA All-Defensive Second Team, and Hughes contributed 9.1 points per game off the bench. Eric Snow provided with 8.6 points, 6.3 assists and 2.1 steals per game, and Lynch averaged 8.3 points, 6.5 rebounds and 2.0 steals per game. Iverson also finished in fourth place in Most Valuable Player voting, while Snow finished in second place in Most Improved Player voting, and head coach Larry Brown finished in second place in Coach of the Year voting.

In the Eastern Conference First Round of the playoffs, and Iverson's first ever playoff appearance, the Sixers defeated the 3rd–seeded Orlando Magic in four games, in which Iverson recorded a playoff career-high of ten steals in a 97–85 Game 3 home win over the Magic. However, the Sixers were swept in the Eastern Conference Semi-finals by the Indiana Pacers in four straight games.

Following the season, Grant was traded to the Orlando Magic, but was released to free agency, and Mahorn retired after playing in his second stint with the Sixers.

Offseason

Draft picks

Roster

Regular season

Season standings

z – clinched division title
y – clinched division title
x – clinched playoff spot

Record vs. opponents

Playoffs

|- align="center" bgcolor="#ccffcc"
| 1
| May 9
| @ Orlando
| W 104–90
| Allen Iverson (30)
| George Lynch (12)
| Allen Iverson (7)
| Orlando Arena15,267
| 1–0
|- align="center" bgcolor="#ffcccc"
| 2
| May 11
| @ Orlando
| L 68–79
| Allen Iverson (13)
| Theo Ratliff (8)
| George Lynch (6)
| Orlando Arena16,345
| 1–1
|- align="center" bgcolor="#ccffcc"
| 3
| May 13
| Orlando
| W 97–85
| Allen Iverson (33)
| Tyrone Hill (9)
| Eric Snow (8)
| First Union Center20,874
| 2–1
|- align="center" bgcolor="#ccffcc"
| 4
| May 15
| Orlando
| W 101–91
| Allen Iverson (37)
| George Lynch (10)
| Allen Iverson (9)
| First Union Center20,550
| 3–1
|-

|- align="center" bgcolor="#ffcccc"
| 1
| May 17
| @ Indiana
| L 90–94
| Allen Iverson (35)
| Matt Geiger (11)
| Eric Snow (10)
| Market Square Arena16,723
| 0–1
|- align="center" bgcolor="#ffcccc"
| 2
| May 19
| @ Indiana
| L 82–85
| Allen Iverson (23)
| Theo Ratliff (12)
| Eric Snow (6)
| Market Square Arena16,795
| 0–2
|- align="center" bgcolor="#ffcccc"
| 3
| May 21
| Indiana
| L 86–97
| Allen Iverson (32)
| Tyrone Hill (12)
| Eric Snow (9)
| First Union Center20,930
| 0–3
|- align="center" bgcolor="#ffcccc"
| 4
| May 23
| Indiana
| L 86–89
| Allen Iverson (25)
| Matt Geiger (13)
| Eric Snow (7)
| First Union Center20,844
| 0–4
|-

Player statistics

NOTE: Please write the players statistics in alphabetical order by last name.

Season

Playoffs

Awards and records
 Allen Iverson, All-NBA First Team
 Theo Ratliff, NBA All-Defensive Second Team

Transactions

References

See also
 1998–99 NBA season

Philadelphia 76ers seasons
Philadelphia
Philadelphia
Philadelphia